Woobinda (Animal Doctor) was an Australian children's television series about a veterinarian in a fictitious town in rural New South Wales.

Cast
 Don Pascoe as John Stevens
 Lutz Hochstraate as Peter Fischer
 Sonia Hofmann as Tiggie Stevens
 Slim De Grey as Jack Johnson
 Bindi Williams as Kevin Stevens

References

External links
Woobinda (Animal Doctor) at IMDb
https://www.classicaustraliantv.com/woobinda.htm at Classic Australian TV
Woobinda (Animal Doctor) at Australian Television

Australian Broadcasting Corporation original programming
Australian drama television series
1969 Australian television series debuts
1969 Australian television series endings
Television shows set in New South Wales